Zakharchenko is a Ukrainian-language surname, derived from the given name Zechariah. Notable people with the surname include:

Alexander Zakharchenko (1976–2018), Ukrainian separatist leader during the war in Donbas
Lyubov Zakharchenko (1961–2008), Russian poet and singer-songwriter
Stanislav Zakharchenko (born 1994), Russian footballer
Vitaliy Zakharchenko (born 1963), Ukrainian government minister (suspended from duties by the Ukrainian parliament)
Yevgeni Zakharchenko (born 1978), Russian footballer

See also
 
4244 Zakharchenko, main-belt asteroid
Mikhail Vaschenko-Zakharchenko (1825–1912), Ukrainian mathematician

Ukrainian-language surnames
Patronymic surnames
Surnames from given names